1955 in Korea may refer to:
1955 in North Korea
1955 in South Korea